The Kia Joice, or Kia Carstar, is a 7-seat compact MPV produced between 1999 and 2003 by the Korean manufacturer Kia Motors.

Overview
Kia co-developed the vehicle with the Hyundai Motor Company. The Joice shared the same platform as the Hyundai Santamo. The vehicle had a 2.0-liter gasoline engine that produced between 120 and 139 horse power. In 2001, a facelift was introduced for the European market.

Gallery

References

External links 
 Specification

Joice
Compact MPVs
Front-wheel-drive vehicles
2000s cars
Cars introduced in 1999